Saint Lucidius was a bishop of Verona, Italy and is a Roman Catholic saint.

The date of his Episcopate is controverted. He is revered for his holiness and learning, devoting himself in a very special manner to study and prayer, in order to be the better fitted to instruct his flock. His relics are enshrined in the Basilica of Saint Stephen. His feast day is April 26.

References

Italian saints
4th-century Italian bishops
Bishops of Verona
Benedictines
4th-century Christian saints